The Bruce Springsteen and the E Street Band Reunion Tour was a lengthy, top-grossing concert tour featuring Bruce Springsteen and the E Street Band that took place over 1999 and 2000.

The tour was the first set of regular concerts given by Springsteen and the E Street Band in eleven years, since the 1988 Tunnel of Love Express and Human Rights Now! Tours, and followed two lengthy tours by Springsteen without the Band in the intervening years.

The tour was not intended to promote any Springsteen records; the release of the box set Tracks six months earlier had been oriented towards the holiday shopping market, and no longer held any chart action by the time of the tour. The release of the cut-down, single disc 18 Tracks did coincide with the start of the tour but received little publicity or sales.

Itinerary
Tour preparations began in March 1999 with a series of rehearsals at Asbury Park, New Jersey's Convention Hall.  Several dozen of the Springsteen faithful, eager with anticipation at what the long-awaited reunion might bring, stood outside the Hall on the cold and windy boardwalk and beach, hearing what they could from inside the walls and reporting their findings on several Springsteen Internet forums.  It was during one of these sessions that fans first heard runthroughs of "The Train Song", which would become the tour's closing epic "Land of Hope and Dreams". This practice of listening in on rehearsals would continue for all of Springsteen's subsequent tours.  Springsteen then held two public rehearsal concerts in Convention Hall, a practice that would also continue for tours to come.

Springsteen opted to start the Reunion Tour in Europe, perhaps to get the show in top shape before coming home to greater attention.  The first leg of the tour formally began on April 9, 1999, with the first of two nights in Barcelona's Palau Sant Jordi. Barcelona was in the process of becoming one of the strongest centers of Springsteen popularity, and additionally there were hundreds of travelling fans in attendance.  The Europe leg would run through the end of June, finishing in Oslo, and encompass 36 shows in all, featuring a mixture of arenas and stadiums and often playing two nights in a location.

Two weeks later the second leg commenced back in the United States, and took place solely in arenas.  It began with 15 consecutive shows in New Jersey's Continental Airlines Arena. More multi-night stands followed, as the tour concentrated on Springsteen hot spots such as Philadelphia, Boston, Chicago, and Los Angeles.  After 52 shows, the leg finished in Minneapolis in the end of November.

A three-month winter break ensued.  The third leg started up in late February 2000 with a show at Penn State University.  This leg focused on mostly single-night stands in areas that hadn't been reached on the previous leg, including a couple of dates in Canada, and again took place in arenas.  Totalling 44 shows, it concluded in June with 10 consecutive dates in New York City's Madison Square Garden, ending on July 1, 2000.

In all, the tour played 132 shows in 62 cities over a span of 15 months.

Tour dates

Postponed concerts:
1999-08-16 – The Palace of Auburn Hills, Auburn Hills, Michigan, rescheduled to September 8, 1999
1999-08-17 – The Palace of Auburn Hills, Auburn Hills, Michigan, rescheduled to September 9, 1999
1999-09-16 – First Union Spectrum, Philadelphia, Pennsylvania, rescheduled to September 24, 1999, due to heavy rains caused by a hurricane.
1999-11-03 – Target Center, Minneapolis, Minnesota, rescheduled to November 28, 1999, due to Patti Scialfa's perforated eardrum.
1999-11-04 – Target Center, Minneapolis, Minnesota, rescheduled to November 29, 1999, due to Patti Scialfa's perforated eardrum.

The show
The E Street Band's sound changed with this tour.  Originally different because of its inclusion of two keyboard instruments and a saxophone, it was now more guitar-oriented, as different-era second guitarists Steven Van Zandt and Nils Lofgren were both included in the line-up, and as wife Patti Scialfa's greater up-front visibility added a fourth guitar.  The ability of the sound system to keep the instrumental mix clear varied from venue to venue and night to night.
 
Set lists were dynamic throughout the tour.  For a while Tracks''' "My Love Will Not Let You Down", a 1982 Born in the U.S.A. outtake, was the usual show opener.  Although little known, "My Love" contained all the classic E Street Band elements, led by Danny Federici's trademark electronic glockenspiel sound.  Later many other songs served the opener role as well, often equally unknown but less accessible ones that gave the audience pause at the start.  The second slot, however, was usually given to "Prove It All Night" or "The Promised Land", 1970s classics that would pull the audience fully into the show, followed by "Two Hearts", emphasizing the bond between Springsteen and sidekick Van Zandt.  Following those numbers, anything might appear.

Midway through the regular set, a fixed series of five songs always appeared: a loud, full-band "Youngstown", with a fiery guitar solo from Nils Lofgren; a loud, three-guitars-distorting "Murder Inc."; the reliably crowd-rousing anthem "Badlands"; a lengthy take on "Out in the Street" with plenty of Bruce stage antics; and a very elongated "Tenth Avenue Freeze-Out", which served as this tour's band intro song.

It was in "Tenth Avenue Freeze-Out" that the show's theme began to emerge. Springsteen used it to deliver one of his tall tales about the formation of the E Street Band, adopting a preacher persona to first sing sections of the Impressions' "It's All Right" and/or Al Green's "Take Me to the River", all the while describing a quasi-spiritual quest in the guise of band introductions: a journey to "the river of resurrection, where everyone can find salvation. But you can’t get there by yourself."  The band were the people needed: Max Weinberg was introduced as star of Late Night with Conan O'Brien; Garry Tallent got to play the bass riff from "Fire"; Steven Van Zandt was introduced as star of The Sopranos tel-eee-vision show (to which Van Zandt responded with a bit of the theme from The Godfather on his guitar); Patti Scialfa got a build-up as "the first lady of love", after which she would play and sing a verse of her album's title song "Rumble Doll"; and Clarence Clemons would get the biggest build-up of all, leading to the part of "Tenth Avenue Freeze-Out" in which "the Big Man joins the band."

From there the show would drop back into a serious mode, usually featuring a soft band rendition of the gloomy "The Ghost of Tom Joad" followed by a 1970s epic of loss rotated amongst "Backstreets", "Jungleland", and "Racing in the Street".

But then the second piece of the theme came, with the set closer "Light of Day".  Now Springsteen was the backwoods preacher again, stretching out the song and in the middle giving a long sermon on what kind of salvation he was offering.  First would be some local-site-specific glorifying or taunting, and then he would intone in time to band beats:

I'm here tonight – I'm here tonight –

To re-educate ya
To re-suscitate ya
To re-generate ya
To re-confiscate ya
To re-combabulate ya
To re-indoctrinate ya
To re-sex-u-late ya
To re-dedicate ya
To re-liberate ya
With the power, and the gloryWith the power, and the gloryWith the promiseWith the majesty!
With the mystery!!
WITH THE MINISTRY! OF ROCK AND ROLL!!!

Now unlike my competitors,
I cannot ... I shall not ... I will not
Promise you life everlasting.
But I can promise you –
LIFE, RIGHT NOW!This "Ministry of Rock and Roll" litany became the (long) catchphrase of the tour, and t-shirts were printed up with these words on the back.

Encores began with fan favorites such as "Born to Run" and "Thunder Road"; Springsteen would make increased use of turning the house lights on during some such songs, to increase the communal feeling of the concert. 

Lights went back down, as the next-to-last song of the show typically began the third part of the concert's theme.  This was a rendering of "If I Should Fall Behind", originally recorded during the E Street Band's dissolved period, but now cast as a slowly played vow of togetherness:  Springsteen, Van Zandt, Lofgren, Scialfa, and Clemons would each take turns singing a verse, promising to wait for each other.  Last came "Land of Hope and Dreams", the one newly written song to be featured on most of the tour.  Musically based in part around the Impressions' "People Get Ready" but set to a loud guitar churn with a sometimes-heard mandolin riff from Van Zandt, 'Lohad' (as it soon became known to fans) was lyrically a deliberate inversion of Woody Guthrie's "This Train Is Bound For Glory".  In Preacher Bruce's take, all are welcome on the train – "saints and sinners", "losers and winners", "whores and gamblers" – you just get on board.  Stretched to eight or more minutes, with several false endings, 'Lohad' represented the culmination of the show's message of rock and roll revival.

Springsteen celebrated his 50th birthday with a sold-out show on September 24, 1999, at Philadelphia's Wachovia Spectrum, opening the show with praise for his strong Philadelphia fan base, then playing a voicemail recording that a friend of his mother left on her answering machine, singing to him "The Big 50". Springsteen then quoted W. C. Fields, saying that "All things being equal, I'd rather be in Philadelphia", and broke into his early favorite "Growin' Up".

During the tour's third leg in 2000, Springsteen began performing some additional newly written songs, including a couple co-written by Joe Grushecky of Iron City Houserockers fame.  But the new song that gained by far the most attention was "American Skin (41 Shots)".

Finally, the Garden shows and the tour concluded with the sole performance of the 1995 temporary-reunion "Blood Brothers", augmented by an added verse; in the words of writer Robert Santelli, this was "the only song that could sum up what he was feeling ... Tears flowed, onstage and off, and when it was all over, Bruce Springsteen and the E Street Band, had come full circle—blood brothers, one and all."

Songs performed

Critical and commercial reception
The Reunion Tour received generally good reviews.

Chris Willman of Entertainment Weekly stated that the tour "was as much traveling tent revival as reunion tour.... Springsteen drove it home with his nightly impersonation of a preacher during 'Tenth Avenue Freeze-Out', cheerfully bellowing about the soul-saving power of rock. Billy Sunday himself would be hard-pressed to invoke buzzwords like faith and believe as much as they turn up in an evening's worth of Springsteen lyrics. Houselights came up at full blast for minutes at a time, bathing the congregation in divine light and defying the conventional wisdom that rock is best enjoyed in the dark." 
Kevin O'Hare of Infoplease wrote, "the shows sometimes seemed like an oldies revue, due to the dearth of new material that they offered. Springsteen was still electrifying on stage, yet it almost seemed like he'd lost his desire as a songwriter."  Sandy Carter of Z Magazine said that "As we come to the end of the 20th century, it's increasingly difficult to believe in the power of rock and roll to change lives. But with the current reunion tour of Bruce Springsteen and the E Street Band, the tradition rediscovers a glorious, life-affirming eloquence."     Ed Kaz of the Asbury Park Press enjoyed Springsteen's hip-swivelling comment during the "Tenth Avenue Freeze-Out" rap that "I have the Ghost of Tom Jones inside of me!"  Music writer Robert Santelli later stated that, "The shows weren't as long as they used to be, but any rock fans who'd been to their share of concerts could see that Bruce Springsteen and the E Street Band was still the best in the business."

Springsteen himself was happy with the outcome of the tour: "We knew the band was gonna play well and that everybody's commitment was stronger than ever, and people were excited. Hey, it was exciting just to be onstage with those people again. It was a lot of fun standing next to Steve, you know, standing next to Clarence, and you realize that that thing alone was something that ... It had great meaning for our audience and, and for me, in my life." 

The second leg's starting stand of 15 consecutive shows at Continental Airlines Arena not only set a record for the Meadowlands Sports Complex , but also set an industry record for consecutive large arena shows.  The shows were all legitimate sell-outs; the arena has a banner hanging from the rafters to commemorate this achievement, right next to the banners celebrating championships from the resident sports teams.

Sales were not equally strong in all areas of the country, however.  The American South, always an area that Springsteen had less relative popularity in, was becoming even more difficult for him; poor sales were reported in the Little Rock, Arkansas, area , for example.

In fact, the show was pitched towards hard-core Springsteen fans.  Lesser-known tracks and rarities abounded in the set lists; enough album oriented rock radio classics were included to keep knowledgeable rock fans content, but Springsteen's Top 40 pop hits from the 1980s and early 1990s were almost completely ignored, causing marked discontent outside arenas for attendees coming from that perspective.  In other ways, too, the tour was a feast for "Bruce tramps".  Internet forums and ticket exchange sites made travelling to multiple shows easier than ever.  Tips were exchanged about how best to get "jailbait" seats, those in the first 17 rows of the arena floor for which a special bracelet was worn.  In its traditional anti-scalping measure, Springsteen's management held tickets out for day-of-the-show "drop lines", for which ticketless fans organized waiting lines.  Even better was the "Man in Black", a darkly dressed Springsteen representative who would walk the upper rafters before a show and upgrade some of the lucky faithful to front-row seats (and feed the exchanged nosebleeds out to the drop line).  Indeed, some fans purposefully bought or sat in bad seats in hope of an MIB visit, though it seemed to help selection chances if someone young, attractive and female was in the party.

At the time the Reunion Tour completed in mid-2000, it was the highest-grossing concert tour in North America for the year up to that point.   

Broadcasts and recordings
The final two shows at Madison Square Garden became the source for Bruce Springsteen & the E Street Band: Live In New York City, which aired as an HBO television special on April 7, 2001 , and subsequently was released in longer form as a DVD and then a CD.  However none of these forms presented a complete show, nor songs in their original concert order.

Several shows were released as part of the Bruce Springsteen Archives:

 Madison Square Garden, New York 07/01/2000, released October 6, 2017
 Chicago September 30, 1999, released September 7, 2018
 Los Angeles October 23, 1999, released October 11, 2019
 First Union Center, Philadelphia September 25, 1999, released July 3, 2020
 Madison Square Garden, New York 06/27/2000, released March 12, 2021
 Arrowhead Pond, Anaheim 05/22/2000, released January 7, 2022.

Personnel

The E Street Band
 Bruce Springsteen – lead vocals, electric guitar (most lead guitar parts), acoustic guitar, harmonica, rare piano
 Roy Bittan – piano, synthesizer
 Clarence Clemons – saxophone, percussion, background vocals
 Danny Federici – organ, electronic glockenspiel, accordion
 Nils Lofgren – electric guitar (some lead guitar parts), acoustic guitar, pedal steel guitar, background vocals
 Patti Scialfa – acoustic guitar, background vocals, some featured duet vocals
 Garry Tallent – bass guitar, upright bass
 Steven Van Zandt – electric guitar (occasional lead guitar parts), mandolin, background vocals
 Max Weinberg – drums

Weinberg had to take several leaves of absence from his bandleading role on Late Night with Conan O'Brien, and the long break between the second and third legs was partly to accommodate him.

Van Zandt had to juggle his shooting schedule for his role on The Sopranos around the tour's dates; consequently, his character Silvio Dante's involvement in the series' second season was more limited than it would be other seasons.

Sources
 Santelli, Robert.  Greetings From E Street: The Story of Bruce Springsteen and the E Street Band''.  Chronicle Books, 2006.  .
 Springsteen's official website has very little on the 1999–2000 period.
 Backstreets.com's 1999 first leg, second leg, and third leg set lists and show descriptions capture the contents and feel of each show; unfortunately, they are not structured as to allow direct linking to individual shows.
 Bruce Springsteen Killing Floor's database gives valuable coverage as well, and also supports direct linking to individual dates.

References

External links
 Setlists statistics page, for Reunion Tour retrieval queries

Bruce Springsteen concert tours
1999 concert tours
2000 concert tours
Reunion concert tours